Cassius was a French musical duo consisting of producers Philippe Cerboneschi and Hubert Blanc-Francard, better known as Zdar and Boombass (or sometimes Philippe Zdar and Hubert Boombass). Under its different incarnations the duo is likened to the "French Touch" movement of electronic music in the second half of the 1990s.

Members

Boombass

Hubert Blanc-Francard (aka Boombass), born 31 March 1967, is a French musician and producer. He is the son of sound engineer Dominique Blanc-Francard and the older brother of the French musician Mathieu Blanc-Francard, better known by his stage name Sinclair.

Zdar

Philippe Cerboneschi (aka Zdar; born 28 January 1967 in Aix-les-Bains and died 19 June 2019 in Paris) was a French musician, producer and sound engineer, of Italian descent. Zdar was Dominique Blanc-Francard's assistant at studios +XXX (Plus30) when he met Boombass in 1988. Outside the Cassius group, Zdar was producer and sound engineer. He was the owner of the French recording studio Motorbass (inspired by the name of his group with Étienne de Crécy). He notably recorded several albums of -M-, Phoenix and Chromeo. He also recorded for Franz Ferdinand, Beastie Boys, Lou Doillon and Sébastien Tellier among others. He was in a relationship with the French actress Aure Atika with whom he had a daughter (Angelica) and then with Dyane de Serigny with whom he had two other children (Pénélope and James).

History
Zdar and Boombass started working together in 1988, producing albums for the French hip-hop artist MC Solaar. In 1991, they created their first project, called La Funk Mob, and the following year, they started to increasingly experiment with electronic sounds. Zdar's experience with electronic music was influential in his involvement with Étienne de Crécy in the project Motorbass, who released a solo full-length album, Pansoul.

In 1996, Zdar and Boombass then created "Foxxy", their first self-released house music track, under the name Cassius, and the moderate success that followed lead to them remixing tracks for acts such as Air. In January 1999, they released their first single to become a mainstream hit, "Cassius 1999". It was published by Virgin Records, and entered the UK Singles Chart at #7. This was soon followed by their debut album, 1999, which had two more singles released from it, "Feeling For You" and "La Mouche". The music videos for "Cassius 1999" and "Feeling for You" portrayed the character Deadman, from DC Comics, as a DJ superhero.

2002 saw their second album release, Au Rêve.  This featured the "empowered female disco" track "I'm a Woman", with Jocelyn Brown on vocals, as well as the hit single "The Sound of Violence", featuring Steve Edwards on vocals. This album also had collaborations with Wu-Tang Clan member Ghostface Killah and Leroy Burgess.

Cassius returned to the studio in 2006, for the more experimental single "Toop Toop", but the next album, titled 15 Again, featured more vocal collaborations than the duo had done with Au Rêve.

While rehearsing their 15 Again album tour, Cassius provided the community with the a cappella track of their single "Toop Toop" and encouraged fans and friends to start remixing the song. It became an immediate success: the band started the Cassius Workshop project and released more acapellas for remixing purposes. They claim to have received more than 400 remixes.

Cassius's song "I <3 U So" was sampled on the track "Why I Love You" on Jay-Z and Kanye West's 2011 collaboration album Watch the Throne.

In 2016, Cassius released their fourth album, Ibifornia, with Pharrell Williams, Ryan Tedder, Cat Power, Mike D and Matthieu Chédid (as guitarist of the album) as guests.

On 19 June 2019, two days before the release of Cassius's fifth album Dreems, Zdar died after falling from a  building in Paris. He was 52 years old. On the release day of Dreems, the band announced that the album was the final album from Cassius.

Following the passing of Philippe Zdar, Ed Banger and Glitterbox Recordings have come together to release the final collaborative Cassius production, with the blessing of Boombass and Zdar's family. It's a remix of the song 'I'm Not Defeated' by Fiorous. The song was released on 21 February 2020 on limited vinyl edition.

After Zdar's death, Boombass continued his solo career. Being alone now, he says in May 2020, that Cassius has no more reason to be. On 20 September 2019, Boombass released a remix of "Grand petit con" performed by -M-. He unveils on 14 May 2020, "Pour que tu", which is present on EP Le virage, consisting of 5 songs and released on 5 June 2020. On 25 August 2021, Boombass published a book entitled Boombass. Une histoire de la French touch in which he recounts his career in the music industry. The book is published by Léo Scheer Editions.

Discography

Albums

Studio albums

Compilation albums
 The Mighty Bop Meets DJ Cam et La Funk Mob (as La Funk Mob, with Bob Sinclar and DJ Cam) (1995)
 The Bad Seeds 1993–1997 (2004) (as La Funk Mob)
 CASSIUSPLAY: Nike+ Original Run (2008)

EPs 
 The Rawkers E.P. (2010)
 Ibifornia (Remixes) (2017)

DJ mixes 
 I Love Techno (2011)

Singles 
Cassius

La Funk Mob
 "Tribulations Extra Sensorielles" (1994)
 "Casse Les Frontières, Fou Les Têtes En L'Air" (1994, re-release in 1996)
 "357 Magnum Force" (2004)

Production credits

Albums produced by Cassius

Tracks produced by Cassius

Albums produced, mixed and recorded by Zdar
 MC Solaar – Qui sème le vent récolte le tempo (1991)
 Phoenix – United (2000)
 Cut Copy – Bright Like Neon Love (2004)
 Chromeo – Fancy Footwork (2007)
 Phoenix – Wolfgang Amadeus Phoenix (2009)
 Chromeo – Business Casual (2010)
 Two Door Cinema Club – Tourist History (2010)
 The Rapture – In the Grace of Your Love (2011)
 Lou Doillon – Places (2012)
 Kindness – World, You Need a Change of Mind (2012)
 Phoenix – Bankrupt! (2013)
 Jackson And His Computer Band - Glow (2013)
 Sébastien Tellier – Confection (2013)
 Sébastien Tellier – L'Aventura (2014)
 -M-, Toumani Diabaté and Sidiki Diabaté – Lamomali (2017)
 Franz Ferdinand – Always Ascending (2018)
 -M- – Lettre infinie (2019) (Recorded and mixed by Zdar except "Superchérie" et "L'autre paradis")
 Hot Chip – A Bath Full of Ecstasy (2019)

References

External links
Philippe Zdar RBMA video lecture session
Pi-Pole - Cassius DJ booking

1988 establishments in France
Alternative dance musical groups
Electronic music duos
French house music groups
French musical duos
French record producers
French synthpop groups
Musical groups established in 1988
Musical groups from Paris
Nu-disco musicians
Remixers
Musical groups disestablished in 2019
2019 disestablishments in France
Because Music artists